This Prize Awarded by the Audience - Cultura is awarded to comics authors at the Angoulême International Comics Festival since 1989.

The prize was known as Alph-Art du public from 1989-2003, the Prix du public from 2004-2006, in 2008 and 2009 the Essentiel FNAC-SNCF, since it was sponsored by the retailer Fnac and railway authority SNCF, in 2010 and 2010 the Fauve Fnac SNCF - Prix du Public and in 2012 Prix de la BD Fnac. At the end of 2018, the prize is "interrupted" because of the lack of sponsor.

The winner is in bold, the (long) list of nominees follows. No prize was awarded in 1999 or 2007

1980s
 1989: Le Grand Pouvoir du Chninkel by Grzegorz Rosiński and Jean Van Hamme, Casterman

1990s
 1991: : tome 3,  by François Bourgeon, Casterman
 1992: Peter Pan: Londres by Régis Loisel, Vents d'Ouest
 1993: Théodore Poussin: Un passager porté disparu by Frank Le Gall, Dupuis
 1994: Jeux pour mourir by Jacques Tardi, Casterman
 1995: Peter Pan: Tempête by Régis Loisel, Vents d'Ouest
 1996: Thorgal: La Couronne d'Ogotaï by Grzegorz Rosiński and Jean Van Hamme, Le Lombard
 1997: Blake and Mortimer: L’affaire Francis Blake by Ted Benoit and Jean Van Hamme, after Edgar Pierre Jacobs, Dargaud
 1998: :  by François Bourgeon and Claude Lacroix, Casterman
 (1999: no award in this category)

2000s
 2002: : Les canons du 18 mars by Jacques Tardi, after Jean Vautrin, Casterman
 2003: Titeuf: La loi du préau by Zep, Glénat
: La pitié des bourreaux by François Boucq and Alexandro Jodorowsky, Les Humanoïdes Associés
 : L'espoir assassiné by Jacques Tardi, after Jean Vautrin,  Casterman
 Édika: Peurs bleues by Édika, Fluide Glacial
 Kookaburra Universe: Le secret du sniper by G. E. Ranne (Ange), Crisse,  and Christian Patrick, Soleil
 Largo Winch: Shadow by Philippe Francq and Jean Van Hamme, Dupuis
 : Crochet by Régis Loisel, Vents d'Ouest
 : Ni dieu ni diable by André Juillard and Patrick Cothias, Dargaud
 : La vraie vie by Jean-Yves Ferri and Emmanuel Larcenet,  Dargaud
 Le Scorpion: La croix de pierre by Enrico Marini and Stephen Desberg, Dargaud
 The Technopriests: Halkattrazz, l'étoile des bourreaux by Alejandro Jodorowsky and Zoran Janjetov, Les Humanoïdes Associés
 Thorgal: Le barbare by Rosinski and Van Hamme, Le Lombard
 Torso by Marc Andreyko and Brian Michael Bendis, Semic
 Trolls de Troy: Trolls dans la brume by Scotch Arleston and Jean-Louis Mourier,  Soleil
 XIII: Lâchez les chiens by Jean Van Hamme and William Vance, Dargaud
 2004: Blacksad: Arctic nation by Juanjo Guarnido and Juan Diaz Canales,  Dargaud
100 Bullets part 1 by Eduardo Risso and Brian Azzarello, Semic
 20th Century Boys part 10 by Naoki Urasawa, Marvel
  by Enki Bilal, Les Humanoïdes Associés
 : La justice des serpents by François Boucq and Alejandro Jodorowsky, Les Humanoïdes Associés
 Ordinary Victories part 1 Emmanuel Larcenet, Dargaud
 Pyongyang by Guy Delisle, L'Association
 Quartier lointain part 2 by Jirô Taniguchi, Casterman
 : Maudit soit le fruit de ses entrailles by Yslaire, Glénat
 2005: Le sang des Valentines by Christian De Metter and Catel Muller, Casterman
 Une aventure extraordinaire de Vincent van Gogh: La ligne de front by Emmanuel Larcenet, Dargaud
 Jeremiah: Et si un jour la Terre... by Hermann, Dupuis
 Louis Riel by Chester Brown, Casterman
 Poulet aux prunes by Marjane Satrapi, L'Association
  by Shūhō Satō, Glénat
 Thorgal:  by Grzegorz Rosinski and Jean Van Hamme, Le Lombard
 '2006:  by Étienne Davodeau, Delcourt
 Blacksad: Âme rouge by Juanjo Guarnido and Juan Diaz Canales, Dargaud
 : La vengeance du manchot by François Boucq and Alexandro Jodorowsky, Les Humanoïdes Associés
 Le chat du rabbin: Le Paradis terrestre by Joann Sfar, Dargaud
 Cour royale by Martin Veyron and Jean-Marc Rochette, Albin Michel
 Sam and Twitch: Squelettes by Marc Andreyko, Steve Niles and Paul Lee, Delcourt
 Largo Winch: Le prix de l’argent by Philippe Francq and Jean Van Hamme, Dupuis
 Nana part 11 by Ai Yazawa, Ataka-Delcourt
 Naruto part 20 by Masashi Kishimoto, Kana
 Période glaciaire by Nicolas de Crécy, Futuropolis
  by Jacques Tardi, Les Humanoïdes Associés
 Roy et al. by Ralf König, Glénat
  by Jiro Taniguchi, Casterman
 (2007: no award in this category)
 2009: Mon gras et moi by Miss Gally, Delcourt2010s
 2010: , tome 6: Paul à Québec by Michel Rabagliati, La Pastèque
 2011: Blue Is the Warmest Color (Le bleu est une couleur chaude) by Jul Maroh, Glénat
 2012: Portugal by Cyril Pedrosa, Dupuis
 2013: Tu mourras moins bête..., tome 2: Quoi de neuf, docteur Moustache ? by Marion Montaigne, Ankama
 2014:  by Chloé Cruchaudet, Delcourt
 2018:  by Marion Montaigne, Dargaud
(No prize awarded in 2019)

 2020's 

References

Angoulême International Comics Festival
Awards established in 1989
1989 establishments in France